Ronald David Carlivati (born November 25, 1968) is an American screenwriter. He is best known for his tenures as head writer on the ABC Daytime soap operas One Life to Live and General Hospital. He is currently serving a position as head writer for the NBC Daytime soap opera Days of Our Lives.

Career

It was announced in the February 27, 2007, edition of Soap Opera Digest that Carlivati was promoted to Co-Head Writer of One Life to Live alongside Dena Higley. On June 4, 2007, Frank Valentini announced that Carlivati would be promoted to head writer effective immediately. The first episode with Carlivati as Head Writer aired September 11, 2007.

Due to One Life to Live'''s cancellation on ABC, and later the show's abandoned transition to online distribution via production company Prospect Park, it was announced on December 1, 2011, that Carlivati would be taking over as head-writer on ABC's one remaining soap, General Hospital effective January 9, 2012. The first episode with Carlivati as head writer aired February 21, 2012.

One Life to Live
In the months that followed Carlivati's promotion to head writer, the show experienced a creative resurgence, receiving great critical acclaim for revitalizing characters, routinely incorporating and honoring the show's long history, and improving dialogue.  However, the show's ratings continued to slide, a problem that all daytime soap operas have been experiencing in recent years.

Carlivati's work aired until February 14, 2008, when the WGA strike forced a new headwriter (Gary Tomlin) to take over. Once the WGA strike was settled, Carlivati returned as headwriter, with his post-strike episodes hitting the air waves on May 2, 2008.

On June 20, 2008, Carlivati and his writing team won the Daytime Emmy for Outstanding Writing in a Drama Series for his work on OLTL.

With the end of One Live to Live's television run in January 2012, Carlivati joined the writing team at General Hospital.

General Hospital
Following the end of One Life to Live in January 2012, Carlivati was appointed head writer of General Hospital, and his material began airing towards the end of February.

In an effort to bring over fans of One Life to Live, who were now without a soap to call their own, Carlivati brought over Kristen Alderson (Starr Manning), Kassie DePaiva (Blair Cramer), Michael Easton (John McBain), Roger Howarth (Todd Manning) and Florencia Lozano (Tea Delgado) to bring their signature roles to General Hospital. While DePaiva and Lozano only appeared in a guest capacity, the other three became contract cast members. When copyright issues intervened, dictating that the show could not use the characters of Starr Manning, Todd Manning, and John McBain; the three actors under contract at the time were recast as Kiki Jerome, Robert "Franco" Frank, and Silas Clay.

In addition to casting the former One Life to Live actors shortly after his arrival, Carlivati also made a point of re-introducing a wide variety of fan favorite veterans to the canvas, including Tristan Rogers (Robert Scorpio) Genie Francis (Laura Spencer), Lynn Herring (Lucy Coe), Finola Hughes (Anna Devane), Sean Kanan (A.J. Quartermaine) and Kin Shriner (Scott Baldwin) for extended runs. Many of them helped make the 50th anniversary a success during the aforementioned transitional absence of the contracted actors brought over from One Life to Live. On July 24, 2015, ABC announced their decision to replace Carlivati as head-writer of General Hospital with Shelly Altman and Jean Passanante.

Days of Our Lives
On January 23, 2017, Carlivati was announced as the newly appointed head writer for Days of Our Lives, replacing former co-head writers Dena Higley and Ryan Quan. Per reports, this change is said to be "effective immediately". Carlivati's first credit as head writer began on July 19, 2017.

Personal life
Carlivati was born in Rochester, New York, and attended McQuaid Jesuit High School. After graduating high school in 1986, Carlivati attended College of the Holy Cross for undergraduate studies and later went to George Washington University for graduate school, earned a Juris Doctor degree, and currently lives in Manhattan. He is openly gay.

Awards and nominations
Daytime Emmy Award
WINS: (2008 ~ Outstanding Writing in a Drama Series, One Life to Live)
WINS: (2018 - Outstanding Writing in a Drama Series, Days of Our Lives)
NOMINATIONS: (2002 and 2006 ~ Best Writing, One Life to Live)

Writers Guild of America Award
Wins: (2016; Daytime Drama Writing)
Wins: (2014 and 2015; Outstanding Writing in a Drama Series, General Hospital)
NOMINATIONS: (2003 and 2006 ~ One Life to Live'')

Positions held

Head writing tenures

|-

|-

|-

References

American soap opera writers
American male television writers
Living people
1968 births
American gay writers
Writers from Rochester, New York
Screenwriters from New York (state)